The Penske PC-18 was a CART Penske Racing car which was constructed for competition in the 1989 season. The chassis was fielded by two teams, Penske Racing and Patrick Racing.

Rick Mears won the pole position for the 1989 Indianapolis 500 with the car, and Emerson Fittipaldi won the race itself. Fittipaldi went on to win the 1989 CART championship driving the PC-18 chassis.

Eddie Cheever fielded the PC-18 chassis during the 1990 season for the newly formed Chip Ganassi Racing.

Complete Indy Car World Series results
(key) (Results in bold indicate pole position) 

*Includes points scored by other cars.

External links
 penskeracing.com

Indianapolis 500
Team Penske
American Championship racing cars